Salon Fantastique: Fifteen Original Tales of Fantasy is a fantasy short story anthology edited by Ellen Datlow and Terri Windling.

Contents 
La Fée Verte by Delia Sherman
Dust Devil on a Quiet Street by Richard Bowes
To Measure the Earth by Jedediah Berry
A Gray and Soundless Tide by Catherynne M. Valente
Concealment Shoes by Marly Youmans
The Guardian of the Egg by Christopher Barzak
My Travels with Al-Qaeda by Lavie Tidhar
Chandail by Peter S. Beagle
Down the Wall by Greer Gilman
Femaville 29 by Paul Di Filippo
Nottamun Town by Gregory Maguire
Yours, Etc. by Gavin J. Grant
The Mask of '67 by David Prill
The Night Whiskey by Jeffrey Ford
The Lepidopterist by Lucius Shepard

Awards 
The anthology won the 2007 World Fantasy Award for Best Anthology and received third place in the Locus Award for Best Anthology of 2007.

References

External links 

2006 books
2006 short stories
Fantasy anthology series
World Fantasy Award-winning works